John Blennerhassett (1930 – 22 September 2013) was an Irish Fine Gael politician  from County Kerry.

A farm owner and former drapery buyer, he stood as a Fine Gael candidate for Dáil Éireann in the Kerry North constituency at the 1969, 1973, and 1977 general elections.

Blennerhassett did not stand for the Dáil again, but after his 1973 defeat he was nominated by the Taoiseach Liam Cosgrave to the 13th Seanad. He was re-elected in 1977 to the 14th Seanad and in 1981 to the 15th Seanad.

He died in September 2013.

A previous John Blennerhassett was Chief Baron of the Irish Exchequer from 1621–24. He belonged to the Fermanagh branch of the family and was a cousin of Robert Blennerhassett who founded the Kerry branch.

References

1930 births
2013 deaths
Fine Gael senators
Members of the 13th Seanad
Members of the 14th Seanad
Members of the 15th Seanad
Politicians from County Kerry
John
Nominated members of Seanad Éireann